The Hidden Assassins is a 2006 novel by Robert Wilson, the third in his acclaimed Javier Falcón series, set in Seville.

Plot summary
As Inspector Jefe Javier Falcón investigates a mutilated, faceless corpse unearthed on the municipal dump, a massive explosion rocks the beautiful, peaceful city of Seville. An apartment building collapses and a nearby pre-school is devastated, killing and wounding men, women and children. When it is discovered that there was a mosque in the basement of the apartment building the media is quick to assume it is the work of Islamist terrorists.

As a late, high summer heat tightens its grip, panic sweeps through the city and the population flees while the region is put on red alert. More bodies are dragged from the rubble and terror invades the domestic life of the flamboyant judge, Esteban Calderón, and the troubled mind of the captivating Consuelo Jiménez.

With the media and political pressure intensifying, Falcón refuses to be swayed and begins to realise that all is not as it seems. But just as he comes close to cracking the conspiracy he makes the most terrifying discovery of all, and then the race is on to prevent a major catastrophe far beyond Spain's borders.

External links
Official Website of Robert Wilson's Novel
Review From It's A Crime
HarperCollins interview with author from time of publication
Review from The Boston Globe
Review from BlogCritics
Interview with USA publisher Harcourt Books from time of publication
Review from Who-Dunnit.com
Review from Pittsburgh Post-Gazette

2006 British novels
Novels by Robert Wilson
Novels set in Seville
Novels about terrorism
British detective novels
HarperCollins books